Chadwick Pictures was an American film production and distribution company active during the silent and early sound eras. It was originally established in New York by Isaac E. Chadwick (1884 – 1952) in 1920 to release films, but from 1924 also began to produce them. In later years the company's independent films were similar to those of other small studios on Poverty Row. Following the introduction of sound, its releases were handled by Monogram Pictures. In 1933 it ceased production entirely.

Filmography

 The Fire Patrol (1924)
 The Girl in the Limousine (1924)
 I Am the Man (1924)
 The Painted Flapper (1924)
 Meddling Women (1924)
 The Tomboy (1924)
 Flattery (1925)
 A Man of Iron (1925)
 Some Pun'kins (1925)
 The Perfect Clown (1925)
 American Pluck (1925)
 The Midnight Girl (1925)
 Paint and Powder (1925)
 The Unchastened Woman (1925)
 Blue Blood (1925)
 The Wizard of Oz (1925)
 The Test of Donald Norton (1926)
 Devil's Island (1926)
 The Bells (1926)
 Sweet Adeline (1926)
 Transcontinental Limited (1926)
 April Fool (1926)
 Winning the Futurity (1926)
 The Power of the Weak (1926)
 The Prince of Broadway (1926)
 Sunshine of Paradise Alley (1926)
 The Count of Luxembourg (1926)
 Temptations of a Shop Girl (1927)
 Eager Lips (1927)
 Is Your Daughter Safe? (1927)
 Driven from Home (1927)
 Ladies at Ease (1927)
 Naughty (1927)
 The Shamrock and the Rose (1927)
 The Return of Boston Blackie (1927)
 Say It with Diamonds (1927)
 Life of an Actress (1927)
 The Ladybird (1927)
 Life's Mockery (1928)
 The Masked Angel (1928)
 The Devil's Cage (1928)
 The Law of the Sea (1931)
 Police Court (1932)
 Flames (1932)
 The Girl from Calgary (1932)
 Law of the Sea (1932)
 A Strange Adventure (1932)
 The Return of Casey Jones (1933)
 Oliver Twist (1933)
 Jungle Bride (1933)
 Black Beauty (1933)
 Wine, Women and Song (1933)

References

Bibliography

 Mark Evan Swartz. Oz Before the Rainbow: L. Frank Baum's the Wonderful Wizard of Oz on Stage and Screen to 1939. JHU Press, 2002. 

American film studios
Film production companies of the United States